Brent Hall (born 7 January 1986) is an Australian rules footballer in the Australian Football League.

A big man, Hall was drafted by Collingwood in the 2003 National Draft. He was given time to develop at Williamstown during his first season at the club, but he did not show too much form. Used as a key position player at both ends of the ground in 2005 in the VFL, he was lucky to make his debut due to lack of height. Playing as a ruckman, he spent little time on the ground, having little impact.

He would be kept on the list in 2006 but did not manage to play any games for the club, and was delisted at the end of the year.

External links 
Brent Hall at the Collingwood Football Club website 

1986 births
Collingwood Football Club players
Living people
Williamstown Football Club players
South Fremantle Football Club players
Australian rules footballers from Western Australia